Fagersta Municipality (Fagersta kommun) is a municipality in Västmanland County in central Sweden. Its seat is located in the city of Fagersta.

The City of Fagersta (instituted in 1944) was in 1967 merged with Västervåla parish (which had been part of Surahammar Municipality since 1963). In 1971 it was transformed into a municipality of unitary type.

Localities
The municipal seat, Fagersta, is the only locality within the municipality with more than 200 inhabitants.

Another locality of note is Ängelsberg, a village located on Åmänningen Lake.

Politics of Fagersta  
Fagersta is historically a left wing stronghold, with mostly a social democratic majority running the town, a trend only broken with a further left majority between 1998–2014.

Sights 
Engelsberg Ironworks, in Ängelsberg, is a UNESCO World Heritage Site.

Notable people
Anitra Steen, manager of Systembolaget, former civil servant
Lennart Hellsing, writer
Ulf Samuelsson, ice hockey player
Tomas Sandström, ice hockey player
The Hives, rock band

References

External links

Fagersta Municipality – Official site

Municipalities of Västmanland County